Daylon Kayton Claasen (born 28 January 1990) is a South African international soccer player who last played for Maritzburg United, as a winger.

Club career
Born in Klerksdorp, Claasen played youth football with Leicester City Klerksdorp and Vasco Da Gama. He has played professionally in South Africa, the Netherlands and Belgium for Ajax Cape Town, Ajax and Lierse.

Claasen was released by Lierse in April 2013, and subsequently went on trial with Premier League club Everton the same month.

Claasen then went on trial with newly promoted Premier League club Hull City in July 2013, initially under the pseudonym of "James Armstrong" for a match against Winterton Rangers, where he scored one goal, before his actual identity was revealed two days later.

On 21 August 2013, he signed a one-year contract with Polish club Lech Poznań.

In June 2014 he signed a contract with German 2. Bundesliga club 1860 Munich. He scored his first goal for 1860 Munich on 8 August 2015 in the first round of the DFB-Pokal against Hoffenheim, when he brought his team to a 1–0 lead in the 51st minute.

International career
Claasen made his international debut for South Africa in 2010.

References

1990 births
Living people
People from Klerksdorp
Association football midfielders
South African soccer players
South Africa international soccer players
Vasco da Gama (South Africa) players
Cape Town Spurs F.C. players
AFC Ajax players
Lierse S.K. players
Lech Poznań players
TSV 1860 Munich players
Bidvest Wits F.C. players
Maritzburg United F.C. players
Belgian Pro League players
Ekstraklasa players
2. Bundesliga players
South African Premier Division players
South African expatriate soccer players
South African expatriate sportspeople in the Netherlands
South African expatriate sportspeople in Belgium
South African expatriate sportspeople in Poland
South African expatriate sportspeople in Germany
Expatriate footballers in the Netherlands
Expatriate footballers in Belgium
Expatriate footballers in Poland
Expatriate footballers in Germany